Tumarikoppa is a village in Dharwad district of Karnataka, India.

Demographics 
As of the 2011 Census of India there were 294 households in Tumarikoppa and a total population of 1,355 consisting of 697 males and 658 females. There were 165 children ages 0-6.

References

Villages in Dharwad district